Gymnopilus piceinus is a species of mushroom in the family Hymenogastraceae.

See also

List of Gymnopilus species

External links
Gymnopilus piceinus at Index Fungorum

piceinus
Fungi of North America
Taxa named by William Alphonso Murrill